The International Sugar Agreements and similarly named agreements were a series of International treaties that attempted to establish an "orderly relationship between the supply and demand for sugar in the world market."  They eventually established the International Sugar Organization.

Agreements
There have been a number of sugar aggrements:
1937 International Agreement regarding the Regulation of Production and Marketing of Sugar, and Protocol (London, 6 May 1937) that established in Article 2 to "always to assure consumers of an adequate supply of sugar on the world market at a reasonable price not to exceed the cost of production, including a reasonable profit, of efficient producers". It established an International Sugar Council and set quotas for the International free market of sugar.
1942 - Protocol to enforce and to prolong the International Agreement regarding the Regulation of Production and Marketing of Sugar of 6 May 1937 (London, 22 July 1942)  a wartime treaty that extended the original agreement to 31 August 1944.
1944 - Protocol extending the Agreement regarding the Regulation of the Production and Marketing of Sugar of 6 May 1937 (London, 31 August 1944) that again extended the agreement to 31 August 1945, and recognised the newly forming United Nations in setting global commodity policy.  It also made parts of the original agreement inoperative, especially the quotas and other restrictions.
1945-1952 - The agreement was extended each year for another 12 months.  The original agreement of 1937, as renewed, lapsed on 31 August 1953.
1953 - International Sugar Agreement (London, 1 October 1953) was signed similar to the 1937 agreement.
1956 - Protocol amending the International Sugar Agreement of 1 October 1953 (London, 1 December 1956) established at the United Nations Sugar Conference of 1956 with minor amendments and a new quota.
1958 - International Sugar Agreement of 1958 (London, 1 December 1958).
1963 - Protocol for the Prolongation of the International Sugar Agreement of 1 December 1958 (London, 1 August 1963) established at the United Nations Sugar Conference, 1963.
1965 - Protocol for the Further Prolongation of the International Sugar Agreement of 1 December 1958 (London, 1 November 1965).
1968 - International Sugar Agreement, 1968 (New York City, 3 December 1968) formulated at the United Nations Conference on Trade and Development also establishing the International Sugar Organization.
1976 - Extension of the International Sugar Agreement of 13 October 1973 (London, 30 September 1975)
1977 - Further Extension of the International Sugar Agreement of 13 October 1973 (London, 18 June 1976)
1978 - International Sugar Agreement, 1977 (Geneva, 7 October 1977)
1984 - International Sugar Agreement, 1984 (Geneva, 5 July 1984)
1987 - International Sugar Agreement, 1987 (London, 11 September 1987)

References

Treaties of Argentina
Treaties of Australia
Treaties of Belarus
Treaties of Belize
Treaties of Brazil
Treaties of Cameroon
Treaties of Chad
Treaties of Colombia
Treaties of the Republic of the Congo
Treaties of Costa Rica
Treaties of Ivory Coast
Treaties of Croatia
Treaties of Cuba
Treaties of the Dominican Republic
Treaties of Ecuador
Treaties of Egypt
Treaties of El Salvador
Treaties entered into by the European Union
Treaties of Ethiopia
Treaties of Fiji
Treaties of Ghana
Treaties of Guatemala
Treaties of Guyana
Treaties of Honduras
Treaties of Hungary
Treaties of India
Treaties of Indonesia
Treaties of Iran
Treaties of Jamaica
Treaties of Kenya
Treaties of Latvia
Treaties of Madagascar
Treaties of Malawi
Treaties of Mauritius
Treaties of Mexico
Treaties of Morocco
Treaties of Mozambique
Treaties of Nicaragua
Treaties of Nigeria
Treaties of Pakistan
Treaties of Panama
Treaties of Paraguay
Treaties of the Philippines
Treaties of South Korea
Treaties of Moldova
Treaties of Romania
Treaties of Russia
Treaties of Serbia and Montenegro
Treaties of South Africa
Treaties of Sri Lanka
Treaties of the Republic of the Sudan (1985–2011)
Treaties of Eswatini
Treaties of Switzerland
Treaties of Thailand
Treaties of Tunisia
Treaties of Turkey
Treaties of Uganda
Treaties of Ukraine
Treaties of the United Arab Emirates
Treaties of Tanzania
Treaties of Vietnam
Treaties of Zambia
Treaties of Zimbabwe
United Nations treaties
Treaties concluded in 1992
Treaties entered into force in 1993
Treaties concluded in 1968
Food treaties
Treaties establishing intergovernmental organizations
Sugar industry